Haynes Church End is located in the Central Bedfordshire district of Bedfordshire, England.

The settlement is close to the larger villages of Houghton Conquest and Haynes. Haynes Church End forms part of the Haynes civil parish and contains the Grade-II*-listed parish church of St Mary the Virgin, as well as Haynes Park.

References

Villages in Bedfordshire
Central Bedfordshire District